Her Big Story is a 1913 American silent short drama film directed by Allan Dwan starring J. Warren Kerrigan, Charlotte Burton, George Periolat, and Jack Richardson.

External links

1913 films
1913 drama films
Silent American drama films
American silent short films
American black-and-white films
1913 short films
Films directed by Allan Dwan
1910s American films